George Dewey Oxner was an associate justice of the South Carolina Supreme Court.

Oxner was a native of Kinards, South Carolina. He attended Newberry College, where he received an A.B. degree, and the University of South Carolina School of Law (LL.B., 1920).

He practiced law in Greenville before being elected to two terms in the South Carolina House of Representatives. He was elected, in 1932, as a trial court judge. In 1944, he was elevated to the South Carolina Supreme Court and served until his death in 1962.

References

Justices of the South Carolina Supreme Court
1898 births
People from South Carolina
1962 deaths
Place of death missing
20th-century American judges